Tüklə (also, Tükävilä, Tyukavilya, and Tyukevilya) is a village and municipality in the Masally District of Azerbaijan.  It has a population of 1,571.

References 

Populated places in Masally District